In the Falling Dark is the seventh studio album by Canadian singer/songwriter Bruce Cockburn. The album was released in 1976 by True North Records. It is considered a watershed moment in Cockburn's recording career, as he leaves behind the minimal acoustic arrangements of his earlier albums, presenting a fuller band sound. The album received a Canadian Gold Record Award, and was his first album to chart in the United States, reaching No. 191 in Cash Box.

Reception

In a retrospective review, AllMusic critic Brett Hartenbach wrote, "As a whole, this record trumps anything that its predecessors had to offer, almost to the point where it's difficult to imagine that it followed the release of Joy Will Find a Way by only a year. The sound that was merely suggested on his previous recordings is fully realized here... His first U.S. release since 1972, In the Falling Dark may not have made Bruce Cockburn a household name, but it did mark his emergence as an important artist."

Track listing
All songs written by Bruce Cockburn except where noted.

"Lord of the Starfields" – 3:22
"Vagabondage" – 4:17
"In the Falling Dark" (Bruce Cockburn, Marcel Moussette)– 4:50
"Little Seahorse" – 4:30
"Water into Wine"  – 5:30
"Silver Wheels" – 4:41
"Giftbearer" – 4:39
"Gavin's Woodpile" – 8:07
"I'm Gonna Fly Some Day" – 4:02
"Festival of Friends" – 4:38

2003 Deluxe Remaster Bonus Tracks

"Red Brother Red Sister" – 4:16
"Untitled Guitar" – 8:46
"Shepherds" – 7:15
"Dweller by a Dark Stream" – 4:18

Album credits
Personnel
 Bruce Cockburn – composer, vocals, guitar, dulcimer
 Dennis Pendrith – bass on 4 and 9
 Michel Donato – bass on 1–3 and 6–7
 Bob Disalle – drums on 1–4, 6–7, and 9
 Bill Usher – percussion on 1–2, 4, 6–7, and 9
 Tom Anderson – percussion on 3
 Kathryn Moses – flute on 2, 4, and 7; piccolo on 9
 Fred Stone – flugelhorn on 6 and 9; trumpet on 7
 Luke Gibson – backing vocals on 9
 Lynn MacDonald – backing vocals on 9
 Erin Malone – backing vocals on 9

Production
 Marcel Mousette – translation
 Eugene Martynec – producer
 Arnaud Maggs – front cover photo
 Ted Grant – back cover photo
 Bart Schoales – art direction
 Bernie Finkelstein – direction

References

1976 albums
Bruce Cockburn albums
Albums produced by Gene Martynec
True North Records albums